Quitman School District is an accredited public school district providing comprehensive early childhood, elementary and secondary education to students in and around the rural, distant communities of Quitman, Arkansas, United States.

Formed in 1897, when the Quitman Male and Female College consolidated with Central Collegiate Institute of Conway to become what is now named Hendrix College. The former Quitman College turns into Quitman Public School until the facility burned in a fire in 1932. A new Quitman Elementary School is constructed and remains in use until 1964. Now, that building serves as the Building Trades facility for Quitman High School.

Schools 
 Quitman High School—provides secondary education in grades 7 through 12.
 Quitman Elementary School—provides elementary education in kindergarten through grade 6.

References

External links 
 

School districts established in 1897
School districts in Arkansas
Education in Cleburne County, Arkansas
1897 establishments in Arkansas